The Cairo Tower (Borg El-Qāhira) is a free-standing concrete tower in Cairo, Egypt. At , it was the tallest structure in Egypt for 37 years until 1998, when it was surpassed by the Suez Canal overhead powerline crossing. It was the tallest structure in North Africa for 21 years until 1982, when it was surpassed by the Nador transmitter in Morocco. It was the tallest structure in Africa for one year until 1962, when it was surpassed by Sentech Tower in South Africa.

One of Cairo's well-known modern monuments, sometimes considered Egypt's second most famous landmark after the Pyramids of Giza, it stands in the Gezira  district on Gezira Island in the River Nile, close to downtown Cairo.

History
Built from 1956 to 1961, the tower was designed by the Egyptian architect Naoum Shebib, inspired by the Ancient Egyptian Architecture. Its partially open lattice-work design is intended to evoke a pharaonic lotus plant, an iconic symbol of Ancient Egypt. The tower is crowned by a circular observation deck and a revolving restaurant that rotate around its axis occasionally with a view over greater Cairo.

According to documents published by Major General Adel Shaheen, the funds for the construction of the tower were originated from the Government of the United States through the CIA that represented by Kermit Roosevelt, which had provided around $US1-3 million to Gamal Abdel Nasser as a personal gift to him with the intent of stopping his support for Algerian Revolution and other African independence movements. Affronted by the attempt to bribe him, Nasser decided to publicly rebuke the U.S. government by transferring all of the funds to the Egyptian government for the use of the tower construction, which he stated that it would be "visible from the US Embassy just across the Nile, as a taunting symbol of Egypt's, Africa and the Middle East's resistance, revolutions and pride".

The book also stated that the General Intelligence Service took full responsibility for everything related to the design and planning work, including the selection of the architect who was assigned to design, the construction work, and even providing the necessary materials for the building with the aim of giving the heroic character of the president. However, its design was controversial as the Egyptians called it the "waqf Roosevelt" ("Roosevelt's endowment"), which was then mistakenly interpreted by the Embassy of Egypt in Washington, D.C. as the "waqef Roosevelt" ("Roosevelt's erection"). This prompted the Americans to react by calling it "Nasser's prick". Because of that, a local Islamic group issued a fatwa to demolish the tower in the 1990s, stating that it "could excite Egyptian women", but this failed to be implemented due to its influence on national history and popularity among the nation and tourists.

Between 2006 and 2009, the tower underwent an £E15 million restoration project that included a new installation of light decoration. It was stated that the project used the LED lamp for its efficiency on energy consumption.

Gallery

See also

List of tallest buildings in Cairo
List of tallest buildings and structures in Egypt
List of tallest structures in the Middle East
List of tallest structures in the world by country
List of tallest freestanding structures
List of tallest towers in the world
List of revolving restaurants

References

Citations

Books

External links

 cairotower.net, tower's official website (requires Adobe Flash; in English)

Gezira Island
Buildings and structures in Cairo
Towers in Egypt
Lattice shell structures
Towers with revolving restaurants
Buildings and structures completed in 1961
20th century in Egypt
Tourist attractions in Cairo
Phallic monuments
20th-century architecture in Egypt